XS (sometimes marketed as XS - Shields up, fight back) is a first-person shooter released by SCi and GT Interactive on December 31, 1996.

Plot
The game is set in the far future during a gladiator-style blood sport. The main character was told about the event by an associate who is believed dead at the start of the game. The player has to fight through a number of rounds of free for all deathmatch-style combat, choosing a pair of weapons to use before the match begins. The battles are to the death with the corpses of the losers used as meat for fast-food burgers. After defeating all the enemies the player's associate reveals himself and murders the player, taking the prize money for himself.

Reception

References

External links
 

1996 video games
DOS games
DOS-only games
First-person shooters
Video games developed in the United Kingdom
Multiplayer and single-player video games
GT Interactive games
Video games about death games
Video games with 2.5D graphics
Sprite-based first-person shooters